Chichester Falls is a waterfall from the Andy Creek, just east of Fall Creek Lake, in Lane County, Oregon. Access to Chicester Falls is from Forest Road 18, known as Big Fall Creek Road, approximately a half mile from Bedrock Campground.

See also 
 List of waterfalls in Oregon

External links
Chichester Waterfall on Youtube

References

Waterfalls of Lane County, Oregon